Zaza nationalism is an ideology that supports the preservation of Zaza people between Turks and Kurds in Turkey. The movement also supports the idea that the Zaza people are a different ethnic group from Kurds.

History 
After the foundation of the Republic, the people of Zaza participated in many uprisings. In 1925, Zazas led the Sheikh Said and the 1937 Dersim uprising. However, these riots took place mostly in the form of tribal riots and religious riots. Turkish nationalist Hasan Reşit Tankut proposed in 1961 to create a corridor between Zaza-speakers and Kurmanji-speakers to hasten Turkification. In some cases in the diaspora, Zazas turned to this ideology because of the more visible differences between them and Kurmanji-speakers.

Especially in recent years, Zaza language and cultural associations have become widespread, the establishment of the Federation of Zaza Associations and the establishment of the Democracy Time Party have started to adopt Zaza identity more.

Ideology 
In the magazines and books she published, Ebubekir Pamukçu said that Zazas was spent for ideologies such as Kurdish and Turkic. Ebubekir Pamukchu said that if there is no national consciousness, Zaza would be assimilated. He suggested that the term Geographical Zazaistan be used for the region where the zazas live. German Linguist Prof. Dr. Ernst Kausen: "He says that zaza people have a population of 3 million. Zaza people were largely assimilated by the Turks and Kurds." Zaza nationalists accuse the PKK of being against Zazas. According to this section, Zaza settlements in the East were evacuated due to both the state and the PKK.
Supporters of Zaza nationalism are afraid of being assimilated by Turkish and Kurdish influence. They indicate of protecting Zaza culture, language and heritage rather than seeking any kind of autonomy within Turkey.

Reviews 
Many Zazas who consider themselves ethnic Kurdish oppose Zaza nationalism.

In general, contrary to the scientific research on Zazas in Turkey, Zaza language and Zazas are shown as Kurds. In 2012, RTÜK decided to define Zazaki as a dialect by asking the Kurdish institute. TRT does not have a separate channel for Zazaki broadcasts, they are included in TRT Kurdi. In 2015, members of the Diyarbakir Zaza Association requested TRT to establish a television channel broadcasting only in Zazaki. The Ministry of National Education also offers Zazaki teachers as a Kurdish dialect. On the contrary, there are 'Zaza Language and Literature' departments in Bingöl and Munzur Universities within the body of YÖK. 

Rasim Bozbuğa, who has a doctoral thesis on the Zazas, stated that "the millet system applied in the Ottoman period continued in Turkey. Different ethnic groups were evaluated under one roof in the Ottoman Empire. The Ottomans, for example, rejected the Macedonian identity. They included the Macedonians under the Bulgarian umbrella. "In the same way, the effects of this millet system habit on Zazas and their languages ​​are also seen.”

Academic and writer Ali Tayyar Önder also expresses the policy of the state as follows: "Unfortunately, the ignorance of those who represent the state causes the policies to make the Zazas Kurd. Throughout the history of the Republic, as in the Ottoman period, previously district governors, collectors and security forces treated the Zazas as Kurds. "Because of their ignorance. They did not know the difference between the Zaza and the Kurds, so they identified the Zazas as Kurds, like the Kurmancs. Even today, Zazaki is classified as a dialect of Kurdish on state television, contrary to scientific data. This is a big mistake."  In the Ottoman period, there were documents, newspaper articles, poets and writers' opinions that evaluated the Zazas separately from the Kurds. 

In an interview with Kurdmedia, Kurdish-Zaza linguist Mehemed Malmîsanij said the name of this "Zazaistan" publisher was the "Zaza Culture and Publication House" and was part of the Turkish intelligence services with the task of attacking the Kurdish nationalist movement. "The conclusion that I draw... is that these [Zaza nationalist groups] were groups based in the state, or with a more favorable expression, groups that thought in parallel with the state".

PKK leader Abdullah Ocalan criticized Zaza movements as "a tool to weaken Kurdish consciousness" and alleged that Turkey's National Intelligence Organization (MİT) was behind the movement.

The effect on Turkey's policy  
Dilaver Eren, leader of the Democracy Time Party founded by Zazas, said:

References